Dunkirk (French: Dunkerque) is a town and port in northern France.

Dunkirk or Dunkerque may also refer to:

Places

United Kingdom
Dunkirk, Cambridgeshire, a location in the United Kingdom
Dunkirk, Cheshire, see National Cycle Route 56
Dunkirk, Gloucestershire
Dunkirk, Kent, a village between Faversham and Canterbury
Dunkirk, Norfolk, a location in the United Kingdom
Dunkirk, Nottingham
Dunkirk, Staffordshire, a location in the United Kingdom
Dunkirk, Wiltshire

United States
Dunkirk, Indiana, a city in Jay and Blackford counties
Dunkirk, Cass County, Indiana
Dunkirk, Kansas, an unincorporated community
Dunkirk, Maryland
Dunkirk, New York, a city
Dunkirk (town), New York, surrounding the city of Dunkirk
Dunkirk, Ohio
Dunkirk, Wisconsin, a town
Dunkirk (community), Wisconsin, an unincorporated community in the town of Dunkirk

Arts and entertainment 
Dunkirk (1958 film), a British war film
Dunkirk (2017 film), a film directed by Christopher Nolan
Dunkirk (TV series), 2004 BBC docudrama
Dunkirk: The Battle of France, a board wargame
"Dunkirk", a track on The Snow Goose by the British band Camel

Military 
Battle of Dunkirk (disambiguation), various military actions in and around Dunkirk, since the 14th century
Dunkirk evacuation, a 1940 military operation during World War II
Dunkirkers or Dunkirk Privateers, naval force at the service of the Spanish Monarchy during the 16th and 17th centuries

Sport
Dunkirk (American horse), an American racehorse
Dunkirk (British horse), a British National Hunt racehorse
Dunkirk F.C., an English non-league football club
USL Dunkerque, a French football club

Vessels
Dunkerque-class battleship
French battleship Dunkerque
MS Dunkerque Seaways, a cross channel RO-RO Ferry
HMS Dunkirk, the name of four British navy ships